Schönfinkel ( Sheynfinkel,  Šejnfinkeľ):
 Moses (Ilyich) Schönfinkel, born Moisei (Moshe) Isai'evich Sheinfinkel (1889, Ekaterinoslav - 1942, Moscow)
 The Bernays–Schönfinkel class (also Bernays–Schönfinkel-Ramsey class)
 Schönfinkelisation
 Schönfinkelization
 Miron Konstantinovich Vladimirov, born Sheynfinkel' (1879, Kherson - 1925) (ru)
 Vera Konstantinovna Schönfinkel ; (ru)

Jewish surnames
German-language surnames